Parirazona dolorosa is a species of moth of the family Tortricidae. It is found in Santa Catarina, Brazil and sometimes in Western Brazil

References

Moths described in 1932
Cochylini